Sivaganga taluk is a taluk of Sivagangai district of the Indian state of Tamil Nadu. The headquarters of the taluk is the town of Sivaganga.

Demographics
According to the 2011 census, the taluk of Sivaganga had a population of 290,799 with 144,855 males and 145,944 females. There were 1,008 women for every 1,000 men. The taluk had a literacy rate of 71.87%. Child population in the age group below 6 years were 14,478 Males and 13,738 Females.

References 

Taluks of Sivaganga district